Marasmius siccus, or orange pinwheel, is a small orange mushroom in the Marasmius genus, with a "beach umbrella"-shaped cap. The tough shiny bare stem is pale at the top but reddish brown below, and the gills are whitish.

At a microscopic level, the club-shaped spores are very long and thin, being roughly 19 µm by 4 µm.  The distinctive cheilocystidia are broadly club-shaped with finger-like protrusions at the far end.  Such cells also sometimes occur in other related mushrooms and they are known as "broom cells of the siccus type".

This mushroom is found in hardwood forests from the Rocky Mountains to the Appalachian Mountains and also in northern Europe and Asia.

Although nonpoisonous, they are too small to be considered worthwhile as food.

References 

siccus
Fungi of North America